Edmonde Supplice Beauzile (born October 14, 1961) is a Haitian politician. She served in the Chamber of Deputies and Senate and was leader of the Fusion of Haitian Social Democrats from 2011 to 2018.

She was born in Belladère and grew up there and in Maïssade. She was educated at the Lycée Marie-Jeanne and the École Normale Supérieure. She went on to study legal sciences at the Université d'État d'Haïti and received a master's degree in education from the Université de Montréal in 1993. Beauzile served as a member of the Chamber of Deputies from 1990 to 1994 and as a member of the Haitian senate from 2006 to 2012. She also served as the senate's vice-president.

She was elected president of the Fusion of Haitian Social Democrats in September 2011. Beauzile was replaced as party president in August 2018.

Beauzile was considered a serious contender for president of Haiti in the November 2016 Haitian presidential election.

References 

1961 births
Living people
State University of Haiti alumni
Université de Montréal alumni
Fusion of Haitian Social Democrats politicians
Members of the Chamber of Deputies (Haiti)
Members of the Senate (Haiti)